HME may refer to:

HME, Incorporated, a U.S. custom truck manufacturer
Hereditary multiple exostoses
Human monocytotropic ehrlichiosis, an infectious disease
Home medical equipment
Hamble railway station, in England
Heat and moisture exchanger
Human macrophage metalloelastase, an enzyme
Hot melt extrusion
Hermes Aviation, a defunct airline of Malta
Home market effect
Huishui Miao, a language of China
Homemade explosive, often used in improvised explosive devices
Oued Irara–Krim Belkacem Airport, in Algeria
 Humen railway station, China Railway pinyin code HME